Reba is the fourteenth studio album by American country music singer Reba McEntire. McEntire collaborated once again with former rockabilly artist and legendary music producer Jimmy Bowen, and the album was released on April 25, 1988. Gone were the honky tonk stable steel guitars and fiddles of My Kind of Country and Have I Got a Deal for You, to be replaced by a highly produced and orchestrated production. The album recalls to mind the music on the hit parade of the late 1940s and early 1950s. The Nashville and country-soul crossover sounds of the 1960s are also represented. Created before For My Broken Heart and It's Your Call, this was one of the first of McEntire's albums to have a conceptual feeling. This was created by song choice and the use of similar instrumentation and vocal arrangement throughout the album. Reba was a success.

The album was her third #1 country album, and two of its tracks, "I Know How He Feels" and "New Fool at an Old Game," reached No. 1 on the Billboard country singles charts.

A remake of an old jazz vocal standard made famous by Ella Fitzgerald, "Sunday Kind of Love" reached the #5 spot. Also covered was "Respect," a song made famous by Aretha Franklin.

The album debuted at #20 for the week of May 21, 1988, on the Country Albums chart, and peaked at #1 for the week of June 11, 1988. The album stayed at #1 for 6 consecutive weeks.

Three songs from the album, "Do Right By Me", "Wish I Were Only Lonely" and "New Fool At An Old Game", were previously recorded by Michelle Wright on her 1988 album, Do Right By Me.

Track listing

Personnel 
 Reba McEntire – lead vocals
 John Barlow Jarvis – acoustic piano, Yamaha DX7
 Mike Lawler – synthesizers
 Pat Flynn – acoustic guitar, mandolin, bouzouki
 Pam Rose – acoustic guitar, backing vocals
 Dann Huff – electric guitars
 Wayne Nelson – bass guitar
 Russ Kunkel – drums, percussion
 Kirk "Jelly Roll" Johnson – harmonica
 Yvonne Hodges – backing vocals
 Suzy Hoskins – backing vocals
 Mary Ann Kennedy – backing vocals

Production 
 Jimmy Bowen – producer
 Reba McEntire – producer
 Ron Treat – recording engineer 
 Mark J. Coddington – second engineer
 Marty Williams – second engineer
 Bob Bullock – overdub recording 
 Tim Kish – overdub recording 
 Willie Pevear – overdub recording 
 John Guess – mixing
 Glenn Meadows – mastering
 Milan Bogdan – digital editing
 Simon Levy – art direction 
 Katherine DeVault – design 
 Jim McGuire – photography

Studios 
 Recorded at Emerald Sound Studios and Sound Stage Studios (Nashville, Tennessee).
 Mixed and Mastered at Masterfonics (Nashville, Tennessee).

Charts

Weekly charts

Year-end charts

Singles

Certifications

References

1988 albums
Reba McEntire albums
MCA Records albums
Albums produced by Jimmy Bowen